Chapel-en-le-Frith is a civil parish in the High Peak district of Derbyshire, England.  The parish contains 76 listed buildings that are recorded in the National Heritage List for England.  Of these, two are listed at Grade II*, the middle of the three grades, and the others are at Grade II, the lowest grade.  The parish contains the town of Chapel-en-le-Frith and the surrounding area, including the smaller settlements of Dove Holes, Combs, Tunstead Milton, and Whitehough.  Most of the listed buildings are houses, cottages and associated structures, farmhouses and farm buildings.  The other listed buildings include churches and items in a churchyard, a market cross, public houses, two tombstones in a Friends' Burial Ground, a milestone and a milepost, bridges, a set of stocks, structures associated with the Peak Forest Tramway, schools, a mounting block incorporating a dog's kennel, a railway station, and two war memorials.


Key

Buildings

References

Citations

Sources

 

Lists of listed buildings in Derbyshire